The Peter Byberg House, located in Bend, Oregon, is an American Craftsman style house that was erected in 1916.  It was ordered as a kit from the Sears & Roebuck Company. It was listed on the National Register of Historic Places in 1998.

See also
 National Register of Historic Places listings in Deschutes County, Oregon

References

Houses on the National Register of Historic Places in Bend, Oregon
Bungalow architecture in Oregon
1916 establishments in Oregon
Houses completed in 1916